The 2016 Israel Premier Lacrosse League season was the 2nd season of Israel Premier Lacrosse League.

Tel Aviv LC decided to suspend operations for the 2016 season, however Ashdod LC, Kiryat Gat LC, and Be'er Sheva LC joined the league for the 2016 season. A total of 22 games were played, with each team playing either seven or eight games.

Be'er Sheva defeated Haifa in the finals 11:10 for the championship.

Standings

Results

Source:

Player awards

Source:

Team All-Israel

Source:

References

Lacrosse in Israel
Israel Premier Lacrosse
Israel